Le Van Tam Park (Vietnamese: Công viên Lê Văn Tám), previously known as Mạc Đĩnh Chi Cemetery, is a park in Ho Chi Minh City, Vietnam. It formerly was a large and prestigious French colonial cemetery in South Vietnam, located near the US Embassy, Saigon. The cemetery had a wooded, bucolic setting, surrounded by a tall concrete wall, with a gated entrance on Hai Ba Trung Street. It originated as the burial ground for those killed during the 1859 battle for the Gia Dinh Citadel.

The cemetery was built by the French and had a European style confined within a quiet environment, giving it an air of simplicity, eeriness, and majesty. Small winding roads, lined with eucalyptus trees interspersed with straight roads, gave access to all corners of the cemetery. Eight-foot, bone white concrete walls enclosed it all around and gave it an air of isolation and solemnity in the middle of the noisy neighborhood. There were magnificent mausoleums, eight to ten feet high and six to eight feet wide, erected by families to commemorate their deceased. Others were simple tombstones, but no less impressive, with a block of stone marking the gallant deeds of the beloved person. It was by far the largest, cleanest and best-kept cemetery in Saigon.

Burial there was reserved for French governors and colonial officials, high-ranking Vietnamese politicians, generals, former war heroes, celebrities and prominent members of the South Vietnamese society. In 1955 it was named Mac Dinh Chi, after the renowned Vietnamese scholar and diplomat Mạc Đĩnh Chi (1280–1350). South Vietnamese President Ngo Dinh Diem and his brother Ngo Dinh Nhu were interred there in unmarked graves following their assassinations. The famous French correspondent for Time and Newsweek magazines François Sully and the American missionary Grace Cadman were also buried there.

In the early 1980s, Vietnam's communist government declared the cemetery a corrupt reminder of the past. In 1983 the Ho Chi Minh City People's Committee passed a resolution to abolish the cemetery, and ordered all remains to be exhumed and removed. Family members were given two months to claim their loved ones. Then the mausoleums and tombstones were bulldozed to the ground to create a children's park and playground.

See also
 Bình Hưng Hòa Cemetery
 :Category:Burials at Mac Dinh Chi Cemetery

References

Further reading
 Tin Bui, Judy Stowe, Do Van, Carlyle A. Thayer. Following Ho Chi Minh: The Memoirs of a North Vietnamese Colonel. University of Hawaii Press, 1995 
 David Lan Pham. Two hamlets in Nam Bo: memoirs of life in Vietnam through Japanese occupation, the French and American wars, and communist rule, 1940–1986. McFarland, 2000  
 Arthur J. Dommen. The Indochinese experience of the French and the Americans: nationalism and communism in Cambodia, Laos, and Vietnam. Indiana University Press, 2001

External links
 

Cemeteries in Vietnam
French cemeteries
Geography of Ho Chi Minh City
Former cemeteries
Parks in Vietnam